Ribera Salud is a healthcare provider based in Valencia. 90% is owned by Centene and 10% by Banco Sabadell.

It was originally awarded the contract to the Hospital de la Ribera in Alzira, Valencia under a Private Finance Initiative scheme in 1999.  In 2003, the contract was extended to include primary care (including mental health and home care). It developed a unified IT system across all services for further integration. The model has become known as the Alzira model and is recognised as a case study for successful integration of healthcare.

Ribera Salud has since expanded to operate similar models in Torrevieja (starting in 2006), Denia (2008), Manises (2009), Elche (2010) and Torrejón (2011).

On June 28, 2019, Centene purchased an additional stake in Ribera Salud moving its 50% ownership to 90%.

References

External links

Medical and health organisations based in Spain